Circea may refer to:
 Circe, a figure in Greek mythology
 Circaea, a genus of plants

See also 
 Cercié
 Jarzé